Te Pāti Māori, also known as the Māori Party, is a political party in New Zealand advocating indigenous rights. It contests the specially reserved Māori electorates, in which its main rival is the Labour Party. 

Under the current leadership of Rawiri Waititi and Debbie Ngarewa-Packer, it promotes the following policies: the upholding of tikanga Māori, the dismantling of systemic racism, and the strengthening of the rights and tino rangatiratanga promised in Te Tiriti o Waitangi. The party is also committed to a mixture of socially progressive and green policy through a "Tiriti-centric" lens. This includes eradicating Goods and Services Tax on food, opposing deep sea drilling, organising and funding a Māori health authority, lifting the minimum wage to $25 an hour, returning Department of Conservation land to Māori kaitiaki, and reducing homelessness. Since Waititi and Ngarewa-Packer's leadership began, the party has been described as left-wing, progressive, and "unapologetically Māori". 

Tariana Turia founded the Māori Party in 2004 after resigning from the governing Labour Party, in which she served as a minister, over the foreshore and seabed ownership controversy. She and Pita Sharples, a high-profile academic, became the first co-leaders. The party won four Māori seats in the 2005 election and went into Opposition. After the 2008, 2011 and 2014 elections, where the party won five, three and two Māori seats respectively, it supported a government led by the centre-right National Party, with the Māori Party co-leaders serving as ministers outside cabinet. During this time, the party advocated more moderate politics.

The party won no seats in the 2017 election, which was analysed as being backlash for their support of National. Under new leadership they returned at the 2020 election, when Rawiri Waititi won the Waiariki electorate. Although the party's share of the country-wide party vote declined from 1.18% in 2017 to 1.17% in 2020, winning Waiariki gave the party the right to full proportional representation, giving it two MPs, with Debbie Ngarewa-Packer subsequently becoming a list MP. , the party's two MPs are also its co-leaders.

History

Formation

The origins of Te Pāti Māori can be traced back to the 2004 foreshore and seabed controversy, a debate about whether the Māori have legitimate claim to ownership of part or all of New Zealand's foreshore and seabed, that arose during the Fifth Labour Government. A court judgement stated that some Māori appeared to have the right to seek formal ownership of a specific portion of seabed in the Marlborough Sounds. This prospect alarmed many sectors of New Zealand society however, and the Labour Party foreshadowed legislation in favour of state ownership instead. This angered many Māori, including many of Labour's Māori MPs. Two MPs representing Māori electorates, Tariana Turia and Nanaia Mahuta, announced an intent to vote against the legislation.

Turia, a junior minister, after being informed that voting against the government would appear "incompatible" with holding ministerial rank, announced on 30 April 2004 her intention to resign from the Labour Party. Her resignation took effect on 17 May, and she left parliament until she won a by-election in her Te Tai Hauauru seat two months later. After leaving the Labour Party, Turia, later joined by Sharples, began organizing a new political party. They and their supporters agreed that the new organisation would simply use the name of "the Māori Party". They chose a logo of black and red – traditional Māori colours – incorporating a  design, also traditional. The leaders of the Māori Party indicated that they wished to unite "all Māori" into a single political movement. The party was formally established on 7 July 2004.

2005 election
In the 2005 election, the Māori Party won four out of seven Māori seats and 2.12% of the party vote. The latter entitled the party to only three list seats, so the fourth electorate seat caused an overhang seat. In the election night count, the party vote share was under 2% and the Māori Party would have got two overhang seats; when the overhang was reduced to one, National lost a list seat that they appeared to have won on election night. Tariana Turia held Te Tai Hauauru; Pita Sharples won the Tāmaki Makaurau electorate; Hone Harawira, son of Titewhai Harawira, won Te Tai Tokerau; and Te Ururoa Flavell won Waiariki.

First term, 2005–2008
In the post-election period the Māori Party convened a series of hui to decide whether to support Labour or National, though some party leaders indicated they preferred to deal with Labour. That day, however, Turia and Prime Minister Helen Clark met privately and ruled out a formal coalition. Coupled with the support of the New Zealand First, Greens and Progressives, Māori Party support would have given Clark just enough support to govern without the support of other parties. However, in the end, no deal was done and the Māori Party stayed in Opposition, citing that they were not prepared to compromise their positions.

Gerry Brownlee, Deputy Leader of the National Party, claimed after the election that Labour and National each could rely on "57 seats" out of the 62 required in the 2005 election to govern. This implied that National had received support from United Future (3), Act (2) and the Māori Party (4) in addition to National's own 49 seats. Brash himself later supported this statement and claimed he had witnesses to it. This came after the National Party tried to woo the Māori Party in attempts to both see if a coalition arrangement was feasible and to counter any attempts which may have been made by Helen Clark. Tariana Turia denied this claim.

On 24 January 2006 the Māori Party's four MPs were jointly welcomed to Rātana pā with the leader of the National Party, Don Brash, together with his delegation of eight MPs. They had been intended to be welcomed on half an hour apart but agreed to be welcomed and sit together. Turia disputed claims that this was pre-arranged, saying: "We're here for a birthday. We're not here for politics." However critics said this would have reminded onlookers of how the Māori Party and National were said to be in coalition or confidence and supply talks. This may also have served to reinforce the Labour Party's election campaign statement that a 'vote for the Māori Party is a vote for National'. One Rātana kaumatua (elder) said this was deliberate and deserved after the talks.

2008 election
In the 2008 general election the Māori Party retained all four of the seats it won in 2005, and won an additional seat, when Rahui Katene won Te Tai Tonga from Labour. Two seats were overhang seats. The party's share of the party vote rose slightly to 2.39%. The Labour Party won the party vote by a large majority in every Māori electorate, meaning that the typical Māori voter had split their vote, voting for a Māori Party candidate with their electorate vote and the Labour Party with their party vote.

The National Party won the most seats overall and formed a minority government with the support of the Māori Party, ACT New Zealand and United Future. Sharples was given the Minister of Māori Affairs portfolio and became an Associate Minister of Corrections and Associate Minister of Education. Turia became Minister for the Community and Voluntary Sector, Associate Minister of Health and Associate Minister for Social Development and Employment. Hone Harawira was critical of the alliance with the National Party and was suspended from the Māori Party in February 2011. He left the party and formed the left-wing Mana Party in April 2011.

2011 election

In the 2011 general election the Māori Party was reduced from five seats to three, as the party vote split between it and Harawira's Mana Party. The Māori Party won three electorate seats. With 1.43% of the party vote, the party was entitled to two seats, resulting in an overhang of one seat. The three MPs were Pita Sharples in Tāmaki Makaurau, Tariana Turia in Te Tai Hauāuru and Te Ururoa Flavell in Waiāriki. Rahui Katene lost the Te Tai Tonga seat to Labour's Rino Tirikatene, and Hone Harawira won the Te Tai Tokerau seat for the Mana Party. The National Party again formed a minority government with the support of the Māori Party, ACT New Zealand and United Future. Pita Sharples again became Minister of Māori Affairs, and Sharples and Turia were ministers outside cabinet. With the retirement of Pita Sharples in 2014, Te Ururoa Flavell became the male co-leader of the party. Tariana Turia also retired in 2014.

2014 election

Final results from the 2014 general election gave the Māori Party two seats in Parliament. Te Ururoa Flavell won the Waiāriki electorate seat, and the party was entitled to one further list seat (to be occupied by the next person on the party list, Marama Fox) as they received 1.32% of the party vote.

2017 election
Prior to the 2017 general election, the Māori Party formed an electoral pact with the Mana Movement leader and former Māori Party MP Hone Harawira. The Māori Party agreed not to contest Te Tai Tokerau as part of a deal to regain the Māori electorates from the Labour Party. During the 2017 election on 23 September, the Maori Party failed to take any seats, with Labour capturing all seven of the Māori electorates. Party co-leader Te Ururoa Flavell expressed sadness at the loss of seats and announced he would be resigning from politics. Fellow co-leader Marama Fox expressed bitterness at the party's defeat, remarking that New Zealand had chosen to return to the "age of colonization" and attacked the two major parties, National and Labour, for their alleged paternalism towards Māori. Fox commented that Māori have "gone back like a beaten wife to the abuser" in regards to Labour's sweep of the Māori seats. Metro Magazine described the Māori Party's poor results as being part of backlash against them for helping National form a government.  Within the following 12 months, the party’s senior figures resigned: Flavell and Fox stepped down from the co-leadership, as well as party president Tukoroirangi Morgan. This opened the field for a new generation of party leaders, namely Rāwiri Waititi and Debbie Ngarewa-Packer.

2020 election 
The party announced John Tamihere as its candidate for the Tāmaki Makaurau electorate in March 2020. Tamihere had held the electorate from 2002 to 2005, but for the Labour Party. He had also run for Mayor of Auckland in 2019 without success. Tamihere's mayoral campaign was more right-wing, and he said the Māori Party could happily work with the National Party. This contradicted Māori Party President Che Wilson, who had set out a clear preference to work with Labour and had said "if we ever do talk to National it will have to be a big deal for us to move that way again."

On 15 April 2020, the party announced that John Tamihere and Debbie Ngarewa-Packer were the new party co-leaders.

The party received a broadcasting allocation of $145,101 for the 2020 election.

At the 2020 general election, held in October, the Māori Party's Rawiri Waititi captured the Waiariki electorate, defeating Labour MP Tāmati Coffey by a margin of 836 votes. This allowed the Māori Party to enter Parliament, and with its party vote of 1.2%, it was entitled to two MPs. After Waititi, Debbie Ngarewa-Packer entered Parliament as the highest-ranked person on the party list.

Under the Māori Party's constitution, its co-leaders must be drawn from its MPs first, and one must be female and one male. As the only male Māori Party MP, Waititi replaced Tamihere as a co-leader.

On 11 November, former party co-leader Tamihere requested a vote recount in the Māori electorates of Tāmaki Makaurau and Te Tai Hauāuru, alleging Māori voters had encountered discrimination during the 2020 election. Tamihere claimed that the recount was intended to expose discriminatory laws such as the five-yearly Māori Electoral Option (which limited the ability of Māori to switch between the general and Māori rolls for a period five years). He also alleged longer wait times for Māori voters at election booths and some Māori not being allowed to vote on the Māori roll.

2020–2023 parliamentary term 
On 26 November 2020, Te Pāti Māori MPs Waititi and Ngarewa-Packer walked out of Parliament after the Speaker of the House Trevor Mallard did not allow them to speak due to parliamentary procedures limiting the speaking time by smaller parties. Waititi had attempted to pass a motion that their party leaders be allowed to give a 15-minute "address in reply" but Mallard had blocked the motion on the grounds that MPs from smaller parties were not scheduled to give their maiden speeches until the following week. Waititi described Mallard's decision as unfair while Ngarewa-Packer claimed that this was "another example of the Māori voice being silenced and ignored."

2020 election donations investigation 
On 12 April 2021, the Electoral Commission referred Te Pāti Māori to the Police for failing to disclose about NZ$320,000 worth of donations within the required timeframe. These donations came from several individuals and organisations including former party co-leader Tamihere (NZ$158,223.72), the Urban Māori Authority (NZ$48,879.85), and the Aotearoa Te Kahu Limited Partnership (NZ$120,000). Party President Che Wilson attributed the late disclosure to the fact that the party was staffed by volunteers and rookies who were unfamiliar with electoral finance laws. On 29 April, the Police referred the investigation into the Māori Party's undeclared donations to the Serious Fraud Office. By late September 2022, the Serious Fraud Office had closed the investigation and decided not to pursue prosecutions against the individuals and parties involved.

In late September 2022, Charities Services general manager Natasha Weight confirmed that the agency was investigating two charities headed by Party President Tamihere, the Te Whānau Waipareira Trust and the National Urban Māori Authority, for financing his 2020 election campaign. According to the Charities Register, Te Whānau o Waipareira Trust Group had loaned Tamihere NZ$385,307 to support his 2020 election campaign while the National Urban Māori Authority had paid NZ$82,695 to support his 2020 election campaign and Te Pāti Māori aspirations. Under existing legislation, charities are not allowed to donate and endorse political parties and candidates or allow them to use a charity's resources. In response, Tamihere accused the Charities Services of discriminating against Te Pāti Māori and Māori causes. Tamihere and Te Pāti Māori also confirmed that they would litigate against the Charities Service if the agency ruled against them. Tamihere also criticised The New Zealand Herald journalist Matt Nippert's coverage of the two charities' donations to his campaigns, accusing the newspaper of racism and announcing that Te Pāti Māori would boycott the Herald.

Hate Speech Task Force, 2021 
In June 2021, Te Pāti Māori called for a joint task force between the New Zealand Security Intelligence Service and New Zealand Police targeting right-wing extremists and rising anti-Māori hate speech in response to a YouTube video featuring a masked man calling for the slaughter of Māori and for a civil war. The video was later removed by YouTube for a breach of its community guidelines. In a tweet, the party said that the video contained threats against its MPs, marae and Māori. Police arrested a man after receiving multiple complaints about the video and a day after Te Pāti Māori laid a complaint with the Independent Police Conduct Authority (IPCA). A 44-year-old male was charged with making an objectionable publication.

In the complaint to the IPCA, the party accused the police of having double standards when dealing with death threats made against Pākehā and Māori. It compared the police's response to the video with the treatment of those who made death threats against National MP Simeon Brown. Party co-leader Debbie Ngarewa-Packer stated, "Communication and response time was inadequate, the police have continued to minimise the nature of the threat against us and our people".

Principles and policy 
The party is committed to advancing what it sees as the rights and interests of the Māori, the indigenous people of New Zealand. Increasingly since the beginning of colonisation, Māori have been marginalised and the group is now a minority within New Zealand alongside Pacific Islanders. Te Pāti Māori policy focuses particularly on affordable housing, Māori recruitment into tertiary institutes and a living wage for all workers, based on the premise that Māori are among the low-socioeconomic communities in New Zealand who are the most economically disadvantaged. During the 2020s, Te Pāti Māori has been widely described as progressive, and further to the political left than Labour by Al Jazeera and Newshub. (Previously, during its years in alliance with National, the party had been described as centrist.)

The Māori Party was formed in response to the 2004 foreshore and seabed controversy, a debate about whether Māori have legitimate claim to ownership of part or all of New Zealand's foreshore and seabed. The founders of the party believed that:

Māori owned the foreshore and seabed before British colonisation;
 made no specific mention of foreshore or seabed;
No-one has subsequently purchased or otherwise acquired the foreshore or the seabed; and
Māori should therefore still own the seabed and the foreshore today.

The  (policy platform) of Te Pāti Māori is based on four principles or pillars:
  (includes policies regarding affordable housing, strengthening employment-support for Māori beneficiaries and te reo Māori)
 Te Tiriti o Waitangi principles (includes holding the Crown accountable to their obligations under , and policies on immigration)
  (includes policies on climate change in the Pacific and scholarships for Māori and Pasifika education to advance Māori and Pasifika as a collective)
  (includes policies on growing iwi economic resources and to protect freshwater as a )

These principles enable Te Pāti Māori to be held accountable for the maintenance and furthering of Māori concepts in the decision-making process. These concepts are not reflected in the traditional Westminster system and Māori customary law is excluded from the New Zealand general legal system.

Other Māori-rights-specific party policies have included the upholding of "indigenous values" and compulsory "heritage studies" in schools. In 2022 on Waitangi Day, the party called for Queen Elizabeth II to be removed as New Zealand's head of state and for the return of land to iwi and hapū.

The party is also committed to a mixture of socially progressive and environmentalist policy through a "Titiri-centric" Māori lens.  The party is committed to eradicating Goods and Services Tax on food, opposing deep sea drilling, organising and funding a Māori health authority and reducing homelessness in Māori communities.

Renaming New Zealand campaign 
In September 2021 the party launched an online petition to:
 change the country's official name to Aotearoa and
 officially restore Te Reo Māori names for all towns, cities and other place names.

In its statement is mentioned Article 3 of the Treaty of Waitangi which gave the Māori language equal status with English. By 17 September 2021, 51,000 had signed the petition.

By early June 2022, a petition from Te Pāti Māori to rename New Zealand as "Aotearoa" had received over 70,000 signatures. On 2 June, the petition was submitted before Parliament's petitions committee.  Waititi argued that the proposed name change would recognise New Zealand's indigenous heritage and strengthen its identity as a Pacific country. He opposed the idea of a referendum, claiming it would entrench the "tyranny of the majority".

Electoral results

Parliament

Leadership
, the constitution of Te Pāti Māori states that it must have two leaders, that its co-leaders must be drawn from its MPs first, and that one must be female and one male. These requirements have been in place since at least 2013.

The party's first leaders were Tariana Turia and Pita Sharples. In December 2012, Turia announced she would resign as party co-leader before the 2014 general election. Te Ururoa Flavell announced his interest in a leadership role, but as the Māori Party constitution required male and female co-leaders, he could not take Turia's place. Shortly after this, in July 2013, Sharples resigned as co-leader, saying he would quit politics altogether come the next general election in 2014. He went on to say that "Our supporters deserve a unified party" which indicated that the leadership tension influenced his decision to resign as party co-leader. Flavell replaced him as the party's male co-leader. In the 2014 general election, Marama Fox became the party's first list MP, and – as the party's only female MP – under the party rules automatically became female co-leader.

Following Rawiri Waititi's successful campaign for Waiariki at the 2020 New Zealand general election, he was confirmed as male co-leader, replacing John Tamihere, at a special general meeting of the Māori Party on 28 October.

The party also has a president:

See also

Māori politics
Māori protest movement
Mana Motuhake
Treaty of Waitangi claims and settlements

References

Further reading

External links
Official website

 
Māori political parties in New Zealand
2004 establishments in New Zealand
Indigenous rights organizations
Republicanism in New Zealand